Heth is an unincorporated community in St. Francis County, Arkansas, United States. Heth has a post office with ZIP code 72346.

References

Unincorporated communities in St. Francis County, Arkansas
Unincorporated communities in Arkansas